The  is a 2-car electric multiple unit (EMU) train type operated by the Japanese third sector railway operator Aichi Loop Railway on the Aichi Loop Line since March 2003.

Formations

As of 1 April 2012, the fleet consists of 20 two-car sets formed as shown below, with one motored (Mc) car and one trailer (Tc) car.

 Sets G31-G33 have cars numbered in the 213x and 223x series.
 Sets G51-G52 have cars numbered in the 215x and 225x series.
 The Mc cars are equipped with one single-arm pantograph (sets G8-G11 have two pantographs).

Interior
Passenger accommodation consists of fixed facing 4-seat bays with bench seating by the doorways. Sets G51 and G52 have longitudinal seating throughout. The Tc cars have a universal access toilet. The G30 sets were originally configured to allow tables to be installed, and included internal speakers for use with karaoke equipment on special event services, but these features were subsequently removed.

History
The first four sets, G1-G2 and G31-G32, were delivered to allow driver training between January and March 2003.

From December 2009, the original sets were gradually repainted into the corporate livery with blue bodyside stripes, and the seat moquette was also changed from green to blue.

References

External links

 Aichi Loop Railway 2000 series (Nippon Sharyo) 
 Aichi Loop Railway 2000 series (Japan Railfan Magazine Online) 
 Aichi Loop Railway 2000 series 6th-batch type (Japan Railfan Magazine Online) 

Electric multiple units of Japan
Train-related introductions in 2003
Nippon Sharyo multiple units
1500 V DC multiple units of Japan